Hell Is Empty, and All the Devils Are Here is the fourth album by British extreme metal band Anaal Nathrakh, released on 29 October 2007 by FETO Records. The album title is a quote from the first act of William Shakespeare's The Tempest.

Track listing

Personnel
V.I.T.R.I.O.L. – vocals
Irrumator – all instruments, recording, production, engineering, mixing
Shane Embryonomous – bass ("Screaming of the Unborn", "Shatter the Empyrean")
Josama bin Horvath – vocals ("Genetic Noose")

References

2007 albums
Anaal Nathrakh albums
FETO Records albums